Robert Bonfils may refer to:

 Robert Bonfils (American illustrator) (1922–2018)
 Robert Bonfils (French designer) (1886–1971), French illustrator, painter and designer